Valbrembo is a comune (municipality) in the Province of Bergamo in the Italian region of Lombardy, located about  northeast of Milan and about  northwest of Bergamo.  

Valbrembo borders the following municipalities: Almenno San Bartolomeo, Bergamo, Brembate di Sopra, Mozzo, Paladina, Ponte San Pietro. Part of Valbrembo's territory is part of Parco dei Colli di Bergamo.

Since 1981 it is the seat of the Faunistic Park Le Cornelle.

References